Private Michael Dougherty (May 10, 1844 to February 19, 1930) was an Irish soldier who fought in the American Civil War. Dougherty received the country's highest award for bravery during combat, the Medal of Honor, for his action at Jefferson, Virginia on 12 October 1863. He was honored with the award on 23 January 1897.

Biography
Dougherty was born in Falcarragh, Ireland on 10 May 1844. He enlisted in the 13th Pennsylvania Cavalry on 8 August 1862. On the 12 October 1863, he performed the act of gallantry that earned him the Medal of Honor award. Taken as a prisoner of war on that day, he remained in various Confederate prisons until 12 April 1865.

After his release from prison, he was sent to Camp Fisk, the parole camp set up four-miles outside of Vicksburg, MS. On 24 April 1865, he was placed aboard the Mississippi steamboat Sultana along with almost 2,000 other recently paroled Union prisoners of war. On April 27, 1865, the Sultana exploded her boilers near Memphis, TN, killing almost 1,200 people. Private Dougherty was a survivor. He was eventually sent to Spring Mills, PA, where he was discharged from the army on June 27, 1865. 

Following the war he married Rose Magee, a union which produced 12 children. He lived with his family in Philadelphia, working at the U.S. Mint. In 1908 he published his diary, which chronicled his experiences in Confederate prisons.

He died on 19 February 1930 and his remains are interred at the Saint Marks Roman Catholic Churchyard in Bristol, Pennsylvania.

Medal of Honor citation

See also

List of American Civil War Medal of Honor recipients: A–F

References

1844 births
1930 deaths
Irish-born Medal of Honor recipients
People of Pennsylvania in the American Civil War
Union Army officers
United States Army Medal of Honor recipients
American Civil War recipients of the Medal of Honor